Siddhant Chaturvedi (born 29 April 1993) is an Indian actor who appears in Hindi films. He starred as a teenage cricketer in the Amazon Prime Video web series Inside Edge from 2017 to 2019 and ventured into films with the supporting role of a street rapper in the musical drama Gully Boy (2019), which won him the Filmfare Award for Best Supporting Actor. He has since starred in the romantic drama Gehraiyaan (2022).

Early life
Chaturvedi was born on 29 April 1993 in Ballia, Uttar Pradesh and moved to Mumbai when he was five years old. His father is a chartered accountant and his mother is a homemaker. He attended Mithibai college in Mumbai and initially aspired to be a chartered accountant (CA), while acting on stage as a hobby. While pursuing his CA articleship, he became disillusioned and took some time off, during which he participated in and won The Times of India Fresh Face Contest in 2013.

Career
In 2016, Chaturvedi appeared in the web television sitcom Life Sahi Hai, about four male roommates. The following year, he began starring as Prashant Kanaujia, a teenage cricketer, in the Amazon Prime Video series Inside Edge, which was inspired by the Indian Premier League. Reviewing the first season for Scroll.in, Devarsi Ghosh considered Chaturvedi and his co-star Tanuj Virwani to be the show's "two big acting discoveries". He later reprised his role for the second season in 2019.

At a success party of Inside Edge, filmmaker Zoya Akhtar, whose brother Farhan Akhtar produced the show, spotted and asked Chaturvedi to audition for her next directorial Gully Boy (2019), which marked his film debut and proved to be his breakout role. Starring Ranveer Singh and Alia Bhatt, the film saw Chaturvedi play the supporting role of a street rapper named MC Sher, who fuels the ambitions of Ranveer Singh's titular character. Jay Weissberg of Variety found Chaturvedi to be "impressive" in his part, and Rajeev Masand commended his "charming presence". At the annual Filmfare Awards ceremony, he was awarded with the Filmfare Award for Best Supporting Actor in addition to a nomination for Best Male Debut.

Chaturvedi next appeared in Yash Raj Films's Bunty Aur Babli 2 (2021), co-starring Rani Mukerji, Saif Ali Khan and Sharvari Wagh, a sequel to the crime comedy Bunty Aur Babli (2005). It emerged as a critical and commercial failure. He had a lead role in Shakun Batra's Gehraiyaan (2022), a drama about infidelity, co-starring Deepika Padukone and Ananya Panday. It was released on Amazon Prime Video. Sukanya Verma of Rediff.com found his portrayal of a "tricky part" to be "compelling". He then featured in the comedy horror film Phone Bhoot with Katrina Kaif and Ishaan Khatter. Reviewers were generally unimpressed with the picture, but Saibal Chatterjee of NDTV opined that Chaturvedi had played his "brash and quick-on-the-draw" character well.

Chaturvedi will next star in the action film Yudhra with Malavika Mohanan, and with Ananya Panday and Adarsh Gourav in Kho Gaye Hum Kahan.

Media 
Chaturvedi was ranked in The Times Most Desirable Men at No. 19 in 2019, at No. 15 in 2020.

Filmography

Films

Web series

Awards and nominations

References

External links

 
 
 

Living people
Place of birth missing (living people)
21st-century Indian male actors
Male actors in Hindi cinema
1993 births
Male actors from Mumbai
Zee Cine Awards winners
Filmfare Awards winners
Screen Awards winners